Juan Ángel Michelena (1774 – 29 September 1831) was a Spanish naval officer, he fought against the Royal Navy in Cape St. Vincent, and participated heroically in the defense and reconquest of Buenos Aires against the English invaders. He also served as Acting Governor of the city of Montevideo (Uruguay).

He maintained great loyalty to the Spanish empire during the period of Independence wars. In 1825, Juan Ángel Michelena was designate as Governor of the city and ports of Ferrol, Galicia.

Personal life 

Juan Ángel Michelena was born in Maracaibo (Venezuela), the son of José Ignacio de Michelena and Maria Josefa Moreno, belonging to an illustrious Creole family of Basque descent. Established in Buenos Aires he was married in the Cathedral Mayor to María del Carmen del Pino, daughter of Joaquín del Pino and Rafaela de Vera Mujica. His wife was sister of Juana del Pino, wife of Bernardino Rivadavia.

Michelena and his wife were parents of six children born between 1807 and 1821 (Clara María Rafaela Ramona del Corazón de Jesús, Miguel Magín Wenceslao Joaquín Ramón, José María Alejandro Magín Ramón del Corazón de Jesús, Juan Angel Hilario Ramón Magín, Manuel Francisco Javier Arcadio Ramón Magín del Corazón de Jesús and Rafaela Genoveva Michelena del Pino).

His son Juan Ángel Ramón Higinio Hilario Michelena del Pino, was born on January 5, 1818, in Buenos Aires, and served in the Spanish Navy. He was married in Spain to María de Rada, being the parents of Juan Ángel de Michelena y Rada.

His father José Ignacio de Michelena y Echeverría was born in Cadiz, belonged to a noble family of Basque ancestors. He had served as Alcalde in the City of Caracas, and was member of the Guipuzcoan Company. His mother Maria Josefa Moreno de Mendoza, had born in Ceuta, daughter of Francisco Javier Moreno de Mendoza, governor of Maracaibo, and María Teresa Rodríguez de Balbas.

Military career 

Michelena did his studies in Europe, traveled to Spain to early age, and joined the Armada Española in the military port of Cadiz at age twelve. In 1788, Michelena finished his elementary studies, and was embarked on February 1, in the frigate "Cecilia", with he sailed towards Tangier, Cartagena, Constantinople and the coast of Syria. In 1789, Michelena returned to Cadiz, being promoted to Alferez on January 13 of that same year. He was as an assistant to Juan Joaquín Moreno (Captain the ship "San Lorenzo"), they making trips to Barcelona, Livorno and Naples. He also served to the orders of Félix Ignacio de Tejada, Captain General of the Spanish Navy.

Back in Cadiz, Michelena served two months in the Corps of Dragons of the Armada Española. Later was promoted to Lieutenant, serving in the Havana, Puerto Rico and fought against John Jervis, in the Battle of San Vicente (conflict occurred on February 14, 1797, in Cape St. Vincent). In 1798, he served on the ship "San Pablo" (commanded by the Captain of the Navy Jose de Mazarredo y Salazar), in pursuit of the English squadrons that had blocked the port of Cadiz. Michelena had taking an active part in capture of the "Pitt" sloop of fourteen guns.

In 1803 Michelena was to the control of the brig "Ligero", with which it captured a pirate ship that operated in the Mediterranean. Then went to La Coruña and crossed the Atlantic, to served as correspondent between the Antilles, Tierra Firme and Montevideo.

He was Captain in 1805, when he came to Montevideo, serving to command of General Pascual Ruiz Huidobro. The following year he joined the campaign of Santiago de Liniers. to fight against the British invaders, as head of the sailors who fought on land, participating in the Combate del Retiro. Later he was one of the Captains who led and brought troops to and from the Banda Oriental.

During the second English invasion, Michelena was commissioned to lead the schooner "Remedios", with which managed to put in flight two English brigs.

In September 1807 the Viceroy Liniers, had appointed Michelena as governor in the Banda Oriental, event that causes great commotion in the Uruguayan community. Michelena finally traveled to Montevideo to take over government, after arrival was insulted and beaten in public by Francisco Javier de Elio. He remained during the following years in Montevideo, but did not support the ruling junta installed by Elio in that city in 1808. A year later, Elio was deposed by the new viceroy, Baltasar Hidalgo de Cisneros.

Michelena was in Buenos Aires when the May Revolution broke out, and had accompanied to the General Joaquin de Soria to Montevideo. In an act of stupidity that will cost you dearly, the Primera Junta did not try to prevent who Soria, carry the naval fleet with him toward Montevideo, where they formed the most powerful realist centre. Michelena had helped disarm the revolutionary attempt engineered by Colonel Prudencio Murguiondo in the Banda Oriental.

In December of that same year, 1810, he led a campaign against the shores of the Uruguay river, achieving the recruitment of several towns to obedience from Montevideo, among them Concepción del Uruguay, Gualeguaychú, Paysandú, Soriano, Mercedes, and Colla. When the Uruguayans took up arms early in the next year, Michelena could not prevent the sending reinforcements by the patriots porteños, but at least greatly delayed their progress. Along with Captain Jacinto de Romarate, fought against the patriotic troops in several campaigns, and plundered the coast of the Paraná River, causing the weakening of the porteños.

In July 1811, Michelena had approached the coast of Buenos Aires commanding five Spanish ships, he had order to open fire on the city. In total thirty-one bombs, and three cannonballs, were fired at the Rio de la Plata, without reaching the coast of the city (event known as Primer Bombardeo de Buenos Aires).

In August 1812, he led a Second bombing on Buenos Aires, who only provoked some damage in coast of the river, but caused great psychological effect on the inhabitants.

In 1814 Juan Ángel Michelena participates in the Battle of Buceo, where Spanish naval forces confront against the patriots, led by William Brown. Michelena was one of the prisoners of the battle, when the city surrendered to General Carlos María de Alvear.

On April 14, 1820, he fled to Montevideo, and from that city marched towards Rio de Janeiro, leaving definitively of South America in an English brig that would transfer them towards Gibraltar, being presented two years later in the department of Cadiz, Spain. Retired from active duty, Michelena established his residence in the town of Puerto Real. At the entrance of the French troops to the port of Cadiz, he put himself in command of Count Bordesoulle, who designates it to integrate the Navy of Sanlúcar.

In 1823, Juan Ángel Michelena served to the orders of Guy-Victor Duperré, participating in the bombing against the port of Cádiz, in order to reinstate the regime of Ferdinand VII of Spain. These actions earned him the title of knight of The Order of Saint Hermenegild, being distinguished with the Cross of the Marina Laureate and Legion of Honour of France.

In 1825, Michelena was appointed Governor of Ferrol, being promoted to Brigadier de la Real Armada in 1826. He died in 1831, after being elected as governor of Castellón de la Plana.

References

External links 
 archive.org
 familysearch.org
 familysearch.org
 Michelena

1774 births
1831 deaths
Governors of Montevideo
People of the Spanish American wars of independence
Royalists in the Hispanic American Revolution
Spanish admirals
Grand Croix of the Légion d'honneur
People from Ferrol, Spain
People from Maracaibo
Venezuelan people of Basque descent